This is a list of Finnish supercentenarians (people from Finland who have attained the age of at least 110 years). The oldest person ever from Finland was Maria Rothovius, who died in 2000, aged 112 years 259 days.
All Finnish supercentenarians were born at a time when Finland was an autonomous state of the Russian Empire.

Finnish supercentenarians

Biographies

Aarne Arvonen 

Aarne Armas Arvonen (4 August 1897 – 1 January 2009) was a Finnish supercentenarian who lived for 111 years and 150 days. He became the last known living Finn to have been born in the 1800s, a time when Finland was still an autonomous part of the Russian Empire.

Arvonen was born in Uusimaa, Helsinki, his mother died when the First World War broke out, and his father a left-wing journalist and agitator had remarried, he had lost an eye after an accident playing with a gun, he served for the Red Guard in the Finnish Civil War of 1918, and later became its last surviving veteran. During the war he was captured by the whites during the battle of Joutseno and spent a year at the Tammisaari prison camp. He married Sylvi Emilia Salonen and had two daughters, Irma and Paula. They lived in the Kallio district of Helsinki. When his wife died in 1938, he moved to Järvenpää., where he continued to work in his profession as a decorative carpenter. In the summer of 2005, Arvonen was still living in a house he had built himself. Eventually he moved into the Vanhankylänniemi rest home.
Arvonen had been interested in astronomy since his childhood and in 1921 he became a founding member of the Finnish amateur astronomy association Ursa; his membership lasted nearly 87 years. He celebrated his 111th birthday in 2008 with his family.

References 

Finnish
Supercentenarians